"Punish Her" is a song written by Neval Nader and John Gluck.  The song was produced by Snuff Garrett, and performed by Bobby Vee featuring The Johnny Mann Singers.  It reached #20 on the Billboard Hot 100 and #32 in Canada in 1962.  It was featured on his 1962 album, Bobby Vee's Golden Greats.

The single's B-side, "Someday (When I'm Gone From You)", which featured The Crickets, reached #99 on the Billboard chart.

Other versions
Mike Preston released a version of the song as a single in 1963 in the United Kingdom.

References

1962 songs
1962 singles
Bobby Vee songs
Song recordings produced by Snuff Garrett
Liberty Records singles
Decca Records singles